Sarah Hill (born December 23, 1995) is a Canadian curler from St. John's, Newfoundland and Labrador. She currently skips her own team out of the RE/MAX Centre in St. John's. She is a two-time Newfoundland and Labrador junior champion.

Career
Hill skipped Newfoundland and Labrador at two consecutive Canadian Junior Curling Championships in 2014 and 2015. In 2014, she skipped her team to a 3–6 twelfth place finish and in 2015 her team finished 2–7 with victories over the Northwest Territories and Nunavut.

Hill competed in the 2017 Canadian Mixed Curling Championship playing third for her boyfriend Adam Boland with Zach Young at second and Brooke Godsland at lead. After finishing 3–3 in the round robin, the team went 1–3 in the championship pool, ultimately finishing in sixth place with a 4–6 record.

Due to the COVID-19 pandemic in Newfoundland and Labrador, many teams had to opt out of the 2021 Newfoundland and Labrador Scotties Tournament of Hearts as they could not commit to the quarantine process in order to compete in the 2021 Scotties Tournament of Hearts. This meant that only Hill's rink and her clubmate Mackenzie Mitchell's rink entered the event. In the best-of-five series, Team Hill defeated Team Mitchell three games to one to earn the right to represent Newfoundland and Labrador at the 2021 Scotties in Calgary, Alberta. At the Tournament of Hearts, Hill led her team of Beth Hamilton, Lauren Barron and Adrienne Mercer to a 2–6 round robin record, with wins against New Brunswick's Melissa Adams and Nunavut's Lori Eddy.

The following season, the provincial championship was cancelled due to the pandemic. As the highest ranked team on the CTRS standings, Team Hill were appointed to represent Newfoundland and Labrador at the 2022 Scotties Tournament of Hearts in Thunder Bay, Ontario. The team once again finished the national championship with a 2–6 record, beating Nunavut's Brigitte MacPhail and upsetting Northern Ontario's Krista McCarville in their two victories.

Personal life
Hill was a business student at the Memorial University of Newfoundland. She is currently an air traffic control trainee at NAV Canada. She is engaged to fellow curler Adam Boland.

Teams

References

External links

1995 births
Canadian women curlers
Living people
Curlers from Newfoundland and Labrador
Sportspeople from St. John's, Newfoundland and Labrador